Italian Colombians are Colombian citizens of Italian descent. The word may also refer to someone who has emigrated to Colombia from Italy. Italians have been immigrating to Colombia since the early 16th century.

History

Colonial period
The presence of Italians in Colombia began from the times of Christopher Columbus and Amerigo Vespucci. The very name of Colombia comes from the discoverer of America, idealized by the Venezuelan Francisco de Miranda.

Martino Galeano (member of the noble Galeano Family of Genoa) was one of the most important conquerors of the territory of present-day Colombia (New Kingdom of Granada). As an infantry captain, he directed the military campaign of Pedro Fernández de Lugo, who landed in Santa Marta in 1535. He later founded the town of Vélez, in Santander, being its alderman and co-founder of Bogotá.

In the 18th century, on the ship Santa Rosa, the naval artilleryman Giovanni Andrea Botero arrived from the port of Cádiz to the city of Cartagena de Indias, specifically in January 1716, working in the service of the Spanish crown. The artilleryman Botero was born in the Republic of Genoa and due to illness he had to ask permission, not being Spaniard, to stay in the territory of the Viceroyalty of New Granada. He traveled to the interior of the country and settled in the municipality of Rionegro, Valley of San Nicolás, Antioquia, where he devoted himself to agriculture and gold mining, founding this family in Colombia there.

Independent Colombia
Very few Italians arrived in Colombia before the war of independence led by Simón Bolívar, although several hundred monks came from Italy primarily as priests and missionaries were present in the country.

They have left their mark in many lines of the colombian colonial society.

Although few, these early Italians were present in almost all higher levels of Colombian society, like Juan Dionisio Gamba, the son of a merchant from Genoa who was president of Colombia in 1812.

In the mid-nineteenth century, many Italians arrived from South Italy (especially from the province of Salerno, and the areas of Basilicata and Calabria), arrived on the north coast of Colombia: Barranquilla was the first center affected by this mass migration.

One of the first complete maps of Colombia, adopted today with some modifications, was prepared earlier by another Italian, Agustino Codazzi, who arrived in Bogota in 1849. The Colonel Agustin Codazzi also proposed the establishment of an agricultural colony of Italians, on model of what was done with the Colonia Tovar in Venezuela, but some factors prevented it.

In 1885 diplomatic relations for some years between Italy and Colombia were interrupted. When a wealthy businessman in the Italian-Colombian Cauca named Ernesto Cerruti- was placed against the oligarchy and the church favoring a liberal party and local mason, Bogota authorities confiscated their property and imprisoned. This has caused a blockade of the port by the Colombian Navy and Italian emigration in Italy was partially closed until 1899.

In November 1887 to commemorate the independence of Cartagena, has been interpreted in Bogota Variety Theatre, a fervent song with lyrics (by Rafael Núñez) which was subsequently adopted by the Law 1920 as Hymn of the Republic of Colombia: his charm and melody came from someone who had arrived as first tenor in an opera company, the Italian musician Oreste Sindici (May 31, 1828 – January 12, 1904), and who lived the last years of his life in Bogotá well acclaimed by the Colombians.

Oreste Sindici  was an Italian-born Colombian musician and composer, who composed the music for the Colombian national anthem in 1887. Oreste Sindici died in Bogotá on January 12, 1904, due to severe arteriosclerosis. In 1937 the Colombian government honored his memory.

Some important buildings were created by Italians in the 19th century, like the famous Colón Theater of the capital. It is one of the most representative theatres of Colombia, with a neoclassic architecture: was built by the Italian architect Pietro Cantini and founded in 1892; has more than 2,400 square metres (26,000 sq ft) for 900 people. This famous Italian architect also contributed to the construction of the Capitolio Nacional of the capital.

The sculptor Cesare Sighinolfi travelled to Bogotà, Colombia in 1880, invited by his mentor Pietro Cantini to help decorate the Teatro Cristobal Colon. He made monuments to Christopher Columbus and Isabelle the Catholic (1906). In Bogota, Cesare Sighinolfi succeeded Alberto Urdaneta, as director of the "School of Fine Arts of Bogotá": teaching alongside Luigi Ramelli and Pietro Cantini. In 1896, in Bogota he completed a portrait of Rafael Reyes.

In 1908 -according to the relation of the diplomat Agnoli to the Italian Commissary for Emigration- in Colombia there were nearly one thousand Italians: 400 in Barranquilla, 120 in Bogota, less than 100 in Cartagena and Bucaramanga, while only a few dozens lived in Cucuta and other minor cities. Most of the Italians were from Veneto and Tuscany; their main activity was in commerce and restaurants/hotels but 30 Italians owned huge lands and successfully cultivated with farms.

World War II

After the Second World War, Italian emigration to Colombia was directed primarily toward Bogota, Cali and Medellin. Italian immigrants in Colombia are mainly concentrated in the capital region (and secondarily in Cali & Medellin). They have Italian schools in Bogota  (Institutes "Leonardo da Vinci" and "Alessandro Volta"), Medellín ("Leonardo da Vinci") & Barranquilla ("Galileo Galilei").

Furthermore, there are some institutions promoted by the Italian government, like the "Sociedad Dante Alighieri", the "Instituto de Cultura italiana" and the "Casa de Italia" in the capital.

Italian immigration to Colombia

There are 20,315 Italians in 2019 (by citizenship) that reside in Colombia. And about 2,000,000 Italian descents of full or partial ancestry.

Language

Italian immigrants have integrated easily into Colombian society. Today the vast majority of their descendants only speak Spanish, the national language of Colombia. Approximately 4.3% of the natives still speak (or understand a little) the Italian in 2008. In the last century here has been an influence of the Italian language in some Colombian words.

Cuisine

Italians brought new recipes and types of food to Colombia but also helped in the development of Colombian's cuisine. Spaghetti and pizza are some of the favorite foods in actual Colombia thanks to them.

Like in many other countries, the Italian cuisine is widely popular in most cities and many municipalities of Colombia.

Notable Italian-born people and descendants

Architecture

 Giovanni Buscaglione, architect
 Giancarlo Mazzanti, architect

Arts and Entertainment

 Rodolfo Aicardi, singer
 Fernando Botero, draftsman, painter and sculptor
 María Cecilia Botero, actress and TV presenter
 María Dalmazzo, actress
 Shakira Mebarak Ripoll, singer-songwriter and businesswoman
 Andrea Nocetti, model, actress and Miss Colombia 2000
 Taliana Vargas, model, actress and Miss Colombia 2007 (1st runner up Miss Universe 2008)

Colombian history

 Agustín Codazzi, geographer
 Oreste Sindici, musician and composer

Politics

 Armando Benedetti, politician
 Gustavo Petro, politician (President of Colombia 2022-2026) 
 Fabio Valencia Cossio, politician

Religion

 Tulio Botero, ecclesiastic of the Catholic Church
 Javier de Nicoló, priest and educator
 Mario Revollo Bravo, ecclesiastic of the Catholic Church

Sports

 Nicolás Benedetti,  professional footballer 
 Santiago Botero, professional cyclist 
 Francisco Cassiani,  professional footballer 
 Geovanis Cassiani,  professional footballer 
 Luis Fernando Centi, professional footballer  
 Norberto Peluffo,  professional footballer, coach and sports commentator
 Eddie Salcedo, professional footballer

Others

 Valeria Ayos Bossa, Miss Universe Colombia 2021
 Daniella Álvarez, Miss Colombia 2011
 Salvatore Mancuso, former member of the AUC

See also

Colombia–Italy relations
List of Italian explorers
List of Italian inventors
Italians
White Colombians
White Latin Americans

References

Ethnic groups in Colombia
Colombia